Pázmándy is a surname. Notable people with the surname include:

 Dénes Pázmándy (disambiguation), multiple people
 Vilma Pázmándy (1839–1919), Hungarian noblewoman

Hungarian-language surnames